Louis Nkanza (born 16 October 1949) is a Congolese sprinter. He competed in the 4 × 100 metres relay at the 1972 Summer Olympics and the 1980 Summer Olympics.

References

1949 births
Living people
Athletes (track and field) at the 1972 Summer Olympics
Athletes (track and field) at the 1980 Summer Olympics
Republic of the Congo male sprinters
Olympic athletes of the Republic of the Congo
Place of birth missing (living people)